Tango Gameworks is a Japanese video game developer based in Tokyo. Founded in March 2010 by Shinji Mikami, previously of Capcom, the company was acquired by ZeniMax Media in October that year after suffering financial issues. Tango developed The Evil Within, a survival horror game released in 2014, its sequel, The Evil Within 2, released in 2017, Ghostwire: Tokyo, an action-adventure game released in 2022, and Hi-Fi Rush, a rhythm-based action game, released in 2023.

History 
Shinji Mikami had been with video game developer Capcom since 1989, working on several of its franchises and creating the Resident Evil series of horror video games. Over time, Capcom grew too large for Mikami, who also wished to develop games based around concepts other than horror, as he had for Capcom. For some time, he worked on a freelance basis, directing the action game Vanquish for PlatinumGames and producing the action-horror game Shadows of the Damned for Grasshopper Manufacture. He was repeatedly inquired by Sega to develop a horror game for them, which he rejected. On 1 March 2010, a 44-year-old Mikami and a team of twelve developers founded Tango in Odaiba, Tokyo, where he moved to from his previous office in Osaka. Shigenori Nishikawa, the director of MadWorld for PlatinumGames, joined the company in May 2010. Tango immediately began work on multiple projects, with a small team working for six months on a joke game that would have starred a cockroach standing on two legs and shooting a gun.

Their primary project was Noah, a sci-fi open world survival-adventure game inspired by the 1984 film Dune. In this game, Earth had become mostly uninhabitable and humankind moved to other planets, where one colony loses contact with the others and a research team is tasked with finding them. Shortly after development on this game began, Tango ran into financial issues; according to Mikami, "something happened". American video game publisher Bethesda Softworks stepped in to assist and had its parent company, ZeniMax Media, acquire the studio. That deal was announced on 28 October 2010. For the acquisition, ZeniMax used a part of the  it had previously raised in private funding. Mikami agreed to the acquisition because he felt Bethesda and ZeniMax would provide the "most independent" development environment for Tango. The studio was merged into ZeniMax Asia K.K., ZeniMax's Asia-Pacific branch based in Tokyo's Aomi area, and reorganised as a division called Tango Gameworks. In November 2010, composer Masafumi Takada (formerly of Grasshopper Manufacture), as well as artist Naoki Katakai and programmer Shinichiro Ishikawa (both formerly of Capcom), joined Tango. By March 2012, the studio had 65 employees, with Mikami expecting to eventually grow to 100 staffers.

Following the acquisition by ZeniMax, Mikami envisioned Tango to continue developing multiple games at a time. Noah was cancelled and development on another AAA project, Zwei, commenced. Initially, this game saw a man and woman chained together hunting down a vampire, with either two players controlling each character individually, or one player both simultaneously. Zwei was formally announced in April 2012. Over time, the game evolved into a single-player survival horror game and was retitled The Evil Within, which was announced in April 2013. In August 2014, Tango moved from Aomi to the Shibaura district. The Evil Within was released by Bethesda in October 2014. It was the last game directed by Mikami, who stepped back from this role to have future Tango games provide opportunities for other people. A sequel to The Evil Within, The Evil Within 2, was announced at E3 2017 and released by Bethesda in October 2017. In June 2019, during Bethesda's press conference at E3 2019, Mikami and creative director Ikumi Nakamura announced Ghostwire: Tokyo, an action-adventure game with horror elements. Nakamura resigned from Tango in September 2019, leaving the studio after nine years.

In March 2022, Tango released the mobile game Hero Dice and shut it down five months later. At the Xbox and Bethesda Developer_Direct on January 25, 2023, Tango Gameworks announced Hi-Fi Rush, a rhythm-action game which then released later that day. In February 2023, Bethesda Softworks announced that Mikami will leave Tango Gameworks in the coming months.

Games developed

References

External links 
 

2010 mergers and acquisitions
Japanese companies established in 2010
Japanese subsidiaries of foreign companies
Software companies based in Tokyo
Video game companies established in 2010
Video game companies of Japan
Video game development companies
ZeniMax Media